Kirga is a rural locality (a village) in Bolshegondryskoye Rural Settlement, Kuyedinsky District, Perm Krai, Russia. The population was 538 as of 2010. There are 8 streets.

Geography 
Kirga is located 31 km southwest of Kuyeda (the district's administrative centre) by road. Rabak is the nearest rural locality.

References 

Rural localities in Kuyedinsky District